CIFE - the Centre international de formation européenne is a not-for-profit European institution of higher education and research established in 1954. CIFE encompasses educational and research activities promoting European integration and governance, multilingualism and student mobility. CIFE educates European and international students as future Policy Officers in European institutions and international organisations (Chargé de mission en organisations européennes et internationales), a professional title which is recognised by the French state.

CIFE's activities include Master programmes, summer university programmes, executive training, conferences, seminars and publications.

CIFE has its head office in Nice (France) and branch offices in Berlin (Germany), Brussels (Belgium) and Istanbul (Turkey). The teaching and working languages are English, French and German. The institute is one of the six institutions to receive an operating grant from the European Commission under the Jean Monnet Programme of the Erasmus+ programme. Jean Monnet Activities are designed to promote excellence in teaching and research of the European Union studies worldwide. The activities aim at fostering the dialogue between the academic world and policy makers, particularly with the aim of enhancing governance of EU policies.

The former President of the European Council and Prime Minister of Belgium, Herman Van Rompuy, has been President of CIFE since January 26, 2018. He succeeded Philippe Maystadt, former President of the European Investment Bank appointed in January 2015 and died in December 2017, and Jean-Claude Juncker, CIFE President from 2005 until his election as President of the European Commission in 2014.

European Higher Education 
CIFE's motto is "Learning and living Europe". With a mobile faculty and an established network of international partners it encourages the mobility of its students: participants rotate their study locations each trimester from France (Nice) to Germany (Berlin), the United Kingdom (Canterbury), Turkey (Instanbul), Italy (Rome) and Tunisia (Tunis). Each programme allows students to live in different countries and experience various aspects of European integration and foreign politics, also allowing them to develop their language skills and other soft skills.

Teaching at CIFE is based on problem-focused learning. Teaching methods include workshops, simulations, policy tracking negotiation training, intercultural awareness, project cycle management, and public speaking. International guest lecturers, experts from various European and international organisations, as well as researchers from partner institutions contribute to these teaching modules.

The French state has recognised CIFE's graduate programmes as a qualification at Master level (level 7 EQF). CIFE graduates receive the qualification "Policy Officer in European and International Organisations". The accrediting body (France Compétences) verifies that at least three quarters of CIFE's graduates work in professional fields covered by this qualification. They work as Senior officials in European institutions, policy officers within the UN framework, administrators, diplomats, consultants, researchers for think tanks, lobbyists, and academic experts.

History

Alexandre Marc, recognised by some scholars as one of the most renowned founding fathers of European Federalism established CIFE as an educational institution where federalist ideas would be taught as a remedy against the oppression of individual liberty by both socialist collectivism and extreme nationalism.  In 1964, CIFE founded its own post-graduate institute, the European Institute of High International Studies (IEHEI)(Chinese: 欧洲学院), with the support of the City of Nice and the European Commission. Since its foundation, the Institute has formed multiple ties of cooperation with universities notably in Germany, Italy, Turkey and Central and Eastern Europe to deliver academic education of international impact. The Institute is actively constituted by an international faculty, consisting of university professors and experts from all over the world. CIFE is proud to increasingly endorse diversity year after year with an international student body made up by people of various distinguished backgrounds.
In 2013, Matthias Waechter succeeded to Hartmut Marhold as Director General, who has led the institution since 2002 and who continues to work at CIFE as Director of research and development.

Teaching and Research activities

Master in Advanced European and International Studies 

The Master in Advanced European and International Studies is a one-year advanced master's study programmes designed for students who have at least completed their undergraduate studies with obtained academic degrees equivalent to or higher than a full-time Bachelor's. The programmes focus on European and International studies. Aimed at giving students an encompassing vision of the political, social, economic, and cultural issues of modern world, the programme has the unique feature of promoting European mobility of its students. There are three branches available, each of them designed to allowing the students to live in different countries and experience different aspects of European integration and foreign politics, also allowing them to develop, inter alia, languages' knowledge and other soft skills. This master's study programme is divided into the following branches by the unique characteristics of the faculty, the curriculum, the locations of lectures and the students. At the end of the programme, the participants are required to independently complete and successfully defend a qualified master's thesis which strictly conforms to contemporary international academic standards and requirements at the directorship of a member of the faculty.

The Trilingual Studies branch (English, French, German) 
Established over 40 years ago, the Trilingual branch of the Master in Advanced European and International Studies is the longest-standing educational programme of CIFE. Over the years, more than 2000 students, from over 100 countries, have followed this course. It is known to be one of the few master's programmes in European and International Studies where the languages of instruction are three: French, English, and German. The programme of the Trilingual branch includes terms in Nice, Berlin and Canterbury. A study trip to the European and international institutions completes the programme. The approaches adopted in this programme offer students and educators alike with enriching perspectives: in Nice, the French vision of Europe prevails; in Berlin the perspective on Central and Eastern Europe is approached, from a stand point which allows to analyse the Enlargement of the European Union process. Overall, the Trilingual branch seeks to offer the students insight into the fundamental elements of European integration: French-German relations.

The European Integration and Global Studies branch 
The Anglophone branch started in October 2005, at the very moment the negotiations for the Accession of Turkey to the European Union began. To help the students analysing this process, the programme includes terms in Istanbul, Nice and Berlin, and it is complemented by a study trip to European and international organisations in Europe. In Istanbul, the process of the Europeanization of Turkey is a central topic, together with the neighbourhood policies and external relations of the European Union with the Caucasus countries and Central Asia. In Nice, the students continue to be cultivated with topics of both historical and contemporary significance with the help of distinguished professors, experts and current and former employees of EU bodies, governments and international organisations EU-wide; they undergo mid-term examinations and are taken to selected EU institutions international organisations and governments for formal visits.  And in Berlin, the students prepare themselves for final examinations and thesis drafting. Meanwhile, they are encouraged to participate in academic activities held across Berlin by various universities and organisations. Successful candidates graduate with Master in Advanced European and International Studies, 60 ECTS credits.

The Mediterranean Studies branch - (English and French) 

Master in Global Energy Transition and Governance 

The Master in Global Energy Transition and Governance aims to give a deep understanding of the complexity of the current energy transformations in Europe and worldwide. With a multidisciplinary approach, the programme analyses the links between the different levels of energy governance, from an international to a local level, offering theoretical and practical courses in the fields of energy policy, geopolitics, and the EU transition model. The programme is based in Nice and Berlin, and is complemented by a study trip to Brussels.

Master in Global Economic Governance and Public Affairs 

The Master in Global Economic Governance and Public Affairs: is a one-year joint Master programme by CIFE and the School of Government of LUISS Guido Carli with students travelling between Rome, Berlin and Nice. The Master is focused on how to assess, manage and enhance private and public institutions’ governance with a wide range of economic and digital intelligence tools. Graduates receive:

- Two diplomas for the Joint Master in Global Economic Governance and Policy Affairs (GEGPA), certifying the successful completion of the academic curriculum and granting 60 ECTS at Master level.

- The degree qualification "Policy Officer in European and International organisations" (level 7 EQF), recognised by the French state.

Executive Master in EU Studies 

The Executive Master in EU Studies: this programme is intended for young professionals who wish to update their knowledge of contemporary issues concerning the EU and the world, especially political, economical and juridical questions within the framework of the European Union. An e-learning platform stores the course materials and enables interaction among participants as well as with experts in designated areas. Face-to-face workshops that complement the virtual activities take place in different European capitals such as Berlin, Rome, Budapest or Brussels, where the participants get to meet each other and national decision makers, and constitute a dynamic, international network. The Executive Master in EU Studies Programme allows the students to enrich their studies on governance and management, while enhancing the person's executive capabilities as well as critical thinking. Successful participants will receive a diploma that assists in their pursue of career improvement.

The European Union and Central Asia in the International System (EUCAIS) - Online Master 
The Institut für Europäische Politik (IEP) and the Centre international de formation européenne (CIFE) offer an Online Master Study Programme in „Studies on the EU and Central Asia in the International System"(EUCAIS). The programme is open to post-graduates and young professionals from Central Asia (Uzbekistan, Turkmenistan, Tajikistan, Kyrgyzstan, Kazakhstan, Afghanistan and the Chinese Province of Xinjiang). It offers a combination of e-learning and on-campus study-phases in Berlin and Brussels. 
The Online Master Programme receives significant funding from the VolkswagenFoundation (Germany).

The programme aims at intensifying the knowledge of the EU integration process, to better understand recent developments in the relations between the EU and Central Asia, as well as the situation of these regions in the international economic and political system. The study mode provides access to a recognised European network and to EU-Central Asia academic exchange programmes.
Its alumni are considered well qualified for future careers in Central Asian universities or to work in international organisations, foundations and development agencies in Central Asia. In general, they build networks among academic participants of the Online Academy in Central Asia and strengthen their abilities in scientific work and writing.

European Online Academy for Senior Citizens (ESOA) 

The European Online Academy for Senior citizens offers elderly people the chance of further education. It offers extensive online information as well as face-to-face seminars. Innovative learning methods are adopted for senior citizens who would like to take part in the process of European integration actively and those who wish to help benefit Europe from their experiences and qualifications. The ESOA helps the elderly generations contribute to the development of EU and, at the same time, their ideas and valuable experiences receive rescue from oblivion.

Summer University 

Each summer, CIFE organises the "Université d'été-Summer University" in various European countries. These programmes offer time for reflection on topics and debates of international interest. Some of the past editions included: "Relations between North America and Europe" (Austria), "National Minorities -Today and Tomorrow" (Opole, Berlin and Strasbourg), "The Black Sea region in the enlargement EU" (Moldova, Chişinău), "The relations between the European Union and Turkey" (Turkey, Istanbul), "Actions of the EU against the climatic and environmental changes -problems and perspectives" (Croatia) and "The Europe and rights -effective application of the communitaire right among the EU members" (Sofia, Bulgaria).

Research Projects 
CIFE is part of the consortium of the FEUTURE - The Future of EU-Turkey Relations: Mapping Dynamics and Testing Scenarios - project and of the consortium of the SEnECA - Strengthening and Energizing EU-Central Asia Relations - project. Both are projects receiving fundings of the European Union's Horizon 2020 Research and Innovation Programme.

Publications 

CIFE is also a research centre; its scientific production includes regularly books, brochures, and reviews focused on EU affairs, International Relations and federalism.

L'Europe en formation 
L'Europe en formation is a bilingual journal (which includes French and English articles) dealing with European integration, international relations and federalism, with a transdisciplinary approach bringing together political philosophy, law, economics, sociology and culture.

The journal was first launched in 1960 and has set up a scientific committee in 2008 in order to enhance its scholarly profile.

EU-27 Watch 
The EU-27 Watch has been monitoring debates on EU policy for 12 years and provides a rich set of material from national debates on European policy and thus a unique source for diachronic analyses. Currently, this internet based publication reviews the discourses on European policies in 31 countries in a comparative perspective.

Books and brochures 
CIFE publishes books and brochures on selected subjects, presenting the major problems that challenge European integration. Each edition contains scientific analysis upon a central theme, scientific contributions on various topics, opinions as well as detailed briefing papers on developments in European and World politics.

References

External links
Centre international de formation européenne
IE EI Master in Advanced European and International Studies
Review "L'Europe en formation"
CIFE Master in EU Studies Online
Online Master - The EU and Central Asia in the International System
 The archives of the 'Centre international de formation européenne' at the Historical Archives of the European Union in Florence
Deutsche Kultur International
Article in the FAZ (German)
Article in the Spiegel (German)
Article in the Courrier International (French)
CIFE benefits from the Lifelong Learning Programme of the European Commission

European integration
International organizations based in France
1954 establishments in France
Education in Nice
Educational organizations based in France
Higher education in France